Rutledge is a town in Crenshaw County, Alabama, United States. As of the 2010 census, the population of the town was 467.

Geography
Rutledge is located at the geographic center of Crenshaw County at  (31.733103, -86.309619). The city of Luverne, the Crenshaw County seat, lies along Rutledge's eastern border.

History
Rutledge began as Barber's Crossroads. It was originally settled by Jared Phelps Barber. The town was briefly named Crenshaw, but on June 10, 1867, it was changed to Rutledge in honor of Captain Henry Rutledge, Company H. 59th Alabama Infantry, CSA. Rutledge was the first county seat of Crenshaw County and held that position from March 1867 to May 1893. It was incorporated in 1871.

Demographics

As of the census of 2000, there were 476 people, 201 households, and 127 families residing in the town. The racial makeup of the town was 71.01% White, 28.36% Black or African American, and 0.63% from two or more races.

There were 201 households, out of which 28.4% had children under the age of 18 living with them, 40.8% were married couples living together, 17.9% had a female householder with no husband present, and 36.8% were non-families. 34.8% of all households were made up of individuals, and 18.9% had someone living alone who was 65 years of age or older. The average household size was 2.37 and the average family size was 3.08.

In the town, the population was spread out, with 25.4% under the age of 18, 9.9% from 18 to 24, 26.3% from 25 to 44, 24.2% from 45 to 64, and 14.3% who were 65 years of age or older. The median age was 37 years. For every 100 females, there were 88.9 males. For every 100 females age 18 and over, there were 80.2 males.

The median income for a household in the town was $17,500, and the median income for a family was $22,500. Males had a median income of $25,179 versus $18,583 for females. The per capita income for the town was $10,226. About 30.9% of families and 30.2% of the population were below the poverty line, including 33.6% of those under age 18 and 26.5% of those age 65 or over.

References 

Towns in Crenshaw County, Alabama
Towns in Alabama